Nikita Sergeyevich Mertsalov (born 25 March 1990) is a former Russian professional football player.

Club career
He played in the Russian Football National League for FC Volgar-Gazprom Astrakhan in 2009.

External links
 
 

1990 births
Sportspeople from Astrakhan
Living people
Russian footballers
Association football forwards
FC Volgar Astrakhan players